Aidipsos is a village and a former municipality in Euboea, Greece. The municipality Aidipsos was founded in 1997 by the merger of the municipality Loutra Aidipsou with the communities Agios and Gialtra. Since the 2011 local government reform it is part of the municipality Istiaia-Aidipsos, of which it is a municipal unit. The municipal unit has an area of 115.461 km2. 80 of Greece's 752 hot springs are located in Aidipsos, making it a popular tourist destination. The spas date back more than 20,000 years. In 2011 the population was 6,141. Many famous personalities have visited the town so far, such as Lucius Cornelius Sulla, Sir Winston Churchill, Eleutherios Venizelos, Theodoros Deligiannis, Georgios Theotokis, Ioannis Kondilakis, Archbishop of Athens Theocletus I, Aristotelis Onassis, Maria Callas, Kostis Palamas, Marika Kotopouli and others. Within the modern borders of the municipal units are the remains of ancient town of Aedepsus.

References

Spa towns in Greece
Populated places in Euboea